Fotis Kezos (born July 25, 1995) is a Cypriot professional footballer who plays as a centre back for Ethnikos Achna. He can also play as a defensive midfielder.

Career
He started his career at AEK Athens academy, before graduating to the first team. He followed this up with spells at Othellos Athienou and Nea Salamis before joining Ermis Aradippou.

On 4 July 2017, Kezos joined Leeds United, where he would link up with former Ermis manager Carlos Corberán, who is the head coach of the Under 23's side, with the player revealing the move on his Instagram.

On 8 January 2019, Digenis Oroklinis announced the signing of Kezos. In September 2019, he signed with Aris Limassol FC.

International career
Kezos has represented Cyprus U-17 and Cyprus U-19's at international level.

Honours
AEK Athens
Football League 2: 2013–14 (6th Group)

References

External links
 http://backend.cfa.com.cy/Gr/players/2196795/180025
 https://www.sofascore.com/player/fotis-kezos/186739
 https://www.whoscored.com/Players/245881/Show/Fotis-Kezos
 

1995 births
Living people
Cypriot footballers
Greek footballers
AEK Athens F.C. players
Othellos Athienou F.C. players
Nea Salamis Famagusta FC players
Ermis Aradippou FC players
Trikala F.C. players
Digenis Oroklinis players
Aris Limassol FC players
Cypriot Second Division players
Gamma Ethniki players
Association football central defenders